is a Japanese manga series written and illustrated by Dr. Im. It was serialized on Shueisha's Shōnen Jump+ online platform from April 2018 to March 2019, with its chapters collected in three tankōbon volumes.

Publication
The Birds of Death is written and illustrated by Dr. Im. It was serialized on Shueisha's Shōnen Jump+ online platform from April 25, 2018 to March 3, 2019. Shueisha collected its chapters in three tankōbon volumes, released from September 4, 2018 to May 2, 2019.

The manga is licensed in Indonesia by M&C!.

Volume list

References

External links
 

2018 webcomic debuts
Horror anime and manga
Japanese webcomics
Shōnen manga
Shueisha manga
Webcomics in print